Inglorius is a genus of skipper butterflies in the family Hesperiidae, containing only one species, the mediocre skipper (Inglorius mediocris). It is endemic to Guatemala.

References
Natural History Museum Lepidoptera genus database
Images
Tree of Life
Notes on Hesperiidae in northern Guatemala, with descriptions of new Taxa 

Hesperiinae
Monotypic butterfly genera
Hesperiidae genera